Dennis Letts (September 5, 1934 – February 22, 2008) was an American college professor, and later, in a second career, an actor. As the latter, he originated the critically successful role of Beverly Weston in the Steppenwolf Theatre Company production of the Tony-winning play August: Osage County in the summer of 2007, the writing of which had earned his son, Tracy Letts, a Pulitzer prize.

Early life
Letts was born in Oklahoma City on September 5, 1934. He grew up with his parents, Hazel (Brady) and Charles Haskell Letts, in Wagoner, Oklahoma. He graduated from Wagoner High School in 1952. He enlisted in the United States Air Force after graduation, where he served until 1956.

Letts received his bachelor's degree from Northeastern State University in Tahlequah, Oklahoma, thanks to the G.I. Bill. He went on to earn his master's degree from the University of Tulsa and his doctorate from the University of Illinois Urbana-Champaign. He also earned a Fulbright Scholarship.

Letts married his wife, novelist Billie Gipson, in 1958; the couple had three sons: Dana, Tracy (a playwright), and Shawn (a jazz musician/composer).

Career
Letts spent much of his professional career as a writing and English professor. He taught for more than thirty years, mostly as a faculty member at Southeastern Oklahoma State University in Durant, Oklahoma.

Letts first began acting at the relatively late age of 50 years. Letts first started performing at university and community theaters while still working as a college professor. He began acting as a full second career after retiring from teaching. Letts appeared in more than 40 films and television shows over the course of his career, including parts in high-profile films such as Cast Away in 2000.

His acting credits also included his debut in Bloodsuckers from Outer Space, a science fiction comedy film written and directed by Glen Coburn, Where the Heart Is, a film based on a novel written by his wife, Billie Letts. He served as an editor for his wife's novels, which won various literary awards and have appeared on the New York Times Best Seller list.

August: Osage County
Letts premiered the role of Beverly Weston in the original production of August: Osage County, which was written by his son, Tracy Letts. His character is described as an "Oklahoma patriarch" whose mysterious disappearance reunites his dysfunctional family. August: Osage County first opened at the Steppenwolf Theatre Company in the summer of 2007. The show, as well as Letts's performance, was a critical success.

Illness/death
Letts was diagnosed with lung cancer in September 2007. Despite his diagnosis, Letts chose to remain with the August: Osage County production as the show moved to New York City. The show, with Letts as a full cast member, debuted on Broadway in December 2007. It earned some of the best critical reviews of that particular season. He continued performing eight shows a week of August: Osage County in New York City until February 2008. He kept up his schedule despite his illness and its treatment. Letts died in Tulsa, Oklahoma, on February 22, 2008, at the age of 73. A memorial service was held in Wagoner, Oklahoma. He was survived by his wife, Billie (died 2014), and sons, Tracy, Dana and Shawn.

Filmography

References

External links
 
 

1934 births
2008 deaths
American literary critics
American male stage actors
Deaths from cancer in Oklahoma
Deaths from lung cancer
Literature educators
Male actors from Oklahoma City
Northeastern State University alumni
Southeastern Oklahoma State University faculty
United States Air Force airmen
University of Illinois Urbana-Champaign alumni
University of Tulsa alumni